Elisabeth Lennartz (1902–2001) was a German stage actress. Although she worked primarily in the theatre, she also appeared in several films. Lennartz was an associate of Marlene Dietrich in 1920s Berlin.

In 1928 she starred in the play Katharina Knie by Carl Zuckmayer.

She was married to the actor Gustav Knuth.

Selected filmography
 In the Name of the King (1924)
 Hell on Earth (1931)
 I by Day, You by Night (1932)
 Her First Experience (1939)
 The Girl at the Reception (1940)
 If We All Were Angels (1956)

References

Bibliography
 Spoto, Donald. Blue Angel: The Life of Marlene Dietrich. Rowman & Littlefield, 2000. 
 Wagener, Hans. Carl Zuckmayer Criticism: Tracing Endangered Fame. Camden House, 1995.

External links

1902 births
2001 deaths
German film actresses
German stage actresses
Actors from Koblenz